

316001–316100 

|-id=010
| 316010 Daviddubey ||  || David Richard Jacob Dubey (born 1997), a grandson of British discoverer Norman Falla || 
|-id=020
| 316020 Linshuhow ||  || Jeremy Lin (Jeremy Shu-How Lin; born 1988), an American professional basketball player in NBA || 
|-id=028
| 316028 Patrickwils ||  || Patrick Wils (born 1960), a Belgian amateur astronomer. || 
|-id=042
| 316042 Tilofranz ||  || Tilo Franz Schwab (born 2008), son of German discoverer Erwin Schwab || 
|-id=080
| 316080 Boni || 2009 KD || Boniface Alfonsi (born 1950) is a Corsican retired private detective and author. He wrote La vérité est mon métier in 2012. The discoverer met him under the night sky of Erbaghjolu in 2020. || 
|-id=084
| 316084 Mykolapokropyvny ||  || Mykola Petrovych Pokropyvny (born 1966), the director of the Ivan Ogienko Zhytomyr College of Culture and Arts. || 
|}

316101–316200 

|-id=138
| 316138 Giorgione ||  || Giorgione (1477–1510) was an Italian painter of the Venetian school in the High Renaissance from Venice. || 
|-id=186
| 316186 Kathrynjoyce ||  || Kathryn Mainzer (born 1946), an American artist and graphic designer who is the mother of Amy Mainzer, PI of the NEOWISE mission. || 
|}

316201–316300 

|-
| 316201 Malala ||  || Malala Yousafzai (born 1997), a Pakistani human rights activist who advocates for the rights of women and girls and worldwide access to education. || 
|-id=202
| 316202 Johnfowler ||  || John Fowler (born 1942), an American scientist. || 
|}

316301–316400 

|-bgcolor=#f2f2f2
| colspan=4 align=center | 
|}

316401–316500 

|-id=450
| 316450 Changhsiangtung ||  || Zhang Xiangtong (1907–2007), an academician of the Chinese Academy of Sciences, was a leader of neurophysiology and a founder of neuroscience in China. He was the first to discover dendritic functions of neurons in the brain. || 
|}

316501–316600 

|-id=527
| 316527 Jürgenoberst ||  || Jürgen Oberst (born 1955), a German planetary scientist and expert in remote sensing at the Planetary Geodesy Department of the German Aerospace Center, and a professor for Planetary Geodesy at the Technical University of Berlin. || 
|}

316601–316700 

|-bgcolor=#f2f2f2
| colspan=4 align=center | 
|}

316701–316800 

|-id=709
| 316709 POSS ||  || The Palomar Observatory Sky Surveys (POSS) a major astronomical survey conducted at Palomar Observatory using the Samuel Oschin telescope. POSS-I was undertaken from 1949 to 1958, while POSS-II took from 1987 until 2002. The discovery of this minor planet is based on two photographic plates obtained from the second survey. || 
|-id=741
| 316741 Janefletcher ||  || Jane Fletcher (born 1967), the producer of the BBC television programme The Sky at Night from 2002 to 2013. || 
|}

316801–316900 

|-bgcolor=#f2f2f2
| colspan=4 align=center | 
|}

316901–317000 

|-bgcolor=#f2f2f2
| colspan=4 align=center | 
|}

References 

316001-317000